Custódio Alvim Pereira (6 February 1915 – 12 November 2006) was a Portuguese clergyman, who was Archbishop of Lourenço Marques in Mozambique in the 1960s and early 1970s.
Born in São João do Monte, Portugal, he was ordained on 18 December 1937 and was appointed Auxiliary Bishop of Lourenço Marques on 20 December 1958. On 8 March 1959 he was ordained as the Titular Bishop of Nepte. On 3 August 1962 he was appointed Archbishop of Lourenço Marques, which he held until his resignation on 26 August 1974.

References

Portuguese Roman Catholic bishops in Africa
Portuguese Roman Catholic archbishops
1915 births
2006 deaths
Burials at Campo Verano
Place of birth missing
20th-century Roman Catholic bishops in Mozambique
Roman Catholic archbishops of Maputo